Bosnia and Herzegovina competed at the 1995 World Championships in Athletics from 5 – 13 August 1995.

Results

Men
Track and road events

Women
Track and road events

See also
 Bosnia and Herzegovina at the World Championships in Athletics

References

Nations at the 1995 World Championships in Athletics
World Championships in Athletics
1995